Cheshmeh Shirin (also Romanized as  Cheshmeh Shīrīn, Chashmeh-e Shīrīn, Chashmeh Shīrīn, and Cheshmeh-ye Shīrīn) is a village in Qaleh Tall Rural District, in the Central District of Bagh-e Malek County, Khuzestan Province, Iran. At the 2006 census, its population was 404, in 85 families.

References 

Populated places in Bagh-e Malek County